David Geoffrey Earl (born 20th March 1974) is a British actor and comedian, best known for his comedy character Brian Gittins. He has featured in several projects associated with Ricky Gervais, most notably as Kevin "Kev" Twine in the comedy-drama Derek, and in smaller roles in Extras, After Life and the film Cemetery Junction. Earl also works frequently with comic Joe Wilkinson. Together they co-wrote and starred in the sitcom Rovers, and the comedy series The Cockfields. They also host three podcasts called Gossipmongers, Chatabix and My New Football Club. He also co-wrote and starred in the feature film Brian and Charles where he plays an isolated inventor who builds a robot.

Early life 
Earl was born in Crawley in 1974. Before undertaking any acting roles, Earl worked as a gardener and as a van driver, delivering building tools.

Comedy career 
One of Earl's earliest online videos featured him playing a character called Graham, which he sent to a friend who showed it to Ricky Gervais and Stephen Merchant. They liked the video and Gervais asked Earl to play an obsessive fan, based on the character from the video, who talks to Andy Millman in a pub in an episode of Extras. Around this time Earl played Tony Queen in the film The Penalty King.

Earl went on to create a number of online videos in character as Brian Gittins and played this role in the film Cemetery Junction. In 2012 a sitcom pilot entitled Gittins was broadcast on Channel 4. In the pilot Gittins works as a taxi driver: previously the character had been a cafe owner and this discrepancy is highlighted in an episode of the podcast Flatshare Slamdown, in which Earl appears as Brian. He releases regular Brian Gittins and Friends podcasts.

Another of Earl's characters is Steve "Cumbo" Cumberland, who features in a number of online videos, including a Channel 4 Comedy Blaps series, co-written with Brett Goldstein.

In 2011, Earl was revealed to be the person behind the popular Twitter account of Dr Peter Thraft, a supposed sex therapist.

Personal life 
Earl has three children and lives in Devon.

Filmography

Podcasts

The Brian Gittins Show
A live radio show hosted on Spreaker from 2012-2017, where Brian played the role of 'the worst radio presenter in the world'. Callers would Skype in from around the world, and these included David Edwards and Charles Petrescu.

Brian Gittins and Friends
Brian, David Edwards and Charles Petrescu have a chat with various comedians. It started in 2016, with guests including John Kearns, Lolly Adefope, and Scroobius Pip.

Gossipmongers
In 2019, David Earl, Joe Wilkinson and Poppy Hillstead began a podcast called Gossipmongers, a weekly podcast where listeners send in unsubstantiated rumours. At the end of each episode they choose their favourite piece of gossip from that episode. In 2020 Poppy was booted from the podcast by Joe and David.

Chatabix
In 2021, David Earl and Joe Wilkinson began a podcast called Chatabix, a daily weekday podcast recorded very early in the morning.

My New Football Club
In 2021, David Earl and Jon Beer began a podcast called My New Football Club. A weekly podcast about David becoming a new fan of Exeter City.

References

External links 
 Official website
 
David Earl on Twitch

British male film actors
British male television actors
20th-century births
Living people
Year of birth missing (living people)
Place of birth missing (living people)